Leonard Montague Harris (21 December 1855 – 27 April 1947) was a Tasmania-born New Zealand cricketer who played first-class cricket for Otago and Wellington from 1882 to 1893.

See also
 List of Otago representative cricketers

References

External links

1855 births
1947 deaths
Cricketers from Tasmania
Wellington cricketers
Otago cricketers